KATC may refer to:

KATC-FM, a radio station (95.1 FM) licensed to Colorado Springs, Colorado, United States
KATC (TV), a television station (channel 3) licensed to Lafayette, Louisiana, United States
Korea Army Training Center, a military training center located in Nonsan, South Chungcheong Province, South Korea